"Can U Dig It?" is a single by British band Pop Will Eat Itself, released in 1989 from the band's second album This Is the Day...This Is the Hour...This Is This! and it peaked at #38 in the UK Charts.

The lyrics include a litany of references to movies, comics, music, and television. The sample in which a male voice is heard yelling "Can you dig it?" several times and the female voice at the beginning of the track saying "Let's get down to it, boppers..." were taken from the cult classic 1979 U.S. action film The Warriors.

Music video
An accompanying music video was made for the single. It features Clint Mansell and Graham Crabb singing the song against various changing backgrounds (many of which reference the song lyrics) while in other parts the rest of the band members perform the song with stacks of TVs behind them.

Track listing
All songs written by Pop Will Eat Itself

12"

7"

CD

Charts

Personnel
Clint Mansell - Vocals
Graham Crabb - Vocals
Adam Mole - Guitar
Richard March - Guitar
"The Buzzard" - Wild Guitar

References

External links
  (official PopWillEatItselfVEVO channel)

1989 singles
List songs
1989 songs
RCA Records singles
Pop Will Eat Itself songs
Songs written by Clint Mansell
Song recordings produced by Flood (producer)